Persatuan Pandu Puteri Malaysia (PPPM, Girl Guides Malaysia) is the national Guiding organization of Malaysia. It serves 73,915 members (as of 2008). Founded in 1916, the girls-only organization became a full member of the World Association of Girl Guides and Girl Scouts in 1960.

Program and ideals
The association is divided in six section according to age:
 Pandu Puteri Kelip-Kelip (Firefly Guides) - ages 4 to 8
 Pandu Puteri Tunas (Brownie Guides) - ages 9 to 12
 Pandu Puteri Remaja (Junior Guides) - ages 13 to 15
 Pandu Puteri Renjer (Ranger Guides) - ages 16 to 18
 Pandu Puteri Klover (Clovers Guides) - aged 18 to 30
 Pemimpin (Leaders) 

The Girl Guide emblem incorporates elements of the flag of Malaysia.

Guide Promise
On my honour I promise that I will do my best
to God, King, and my Country Malaysia
to help people at all times
and to obey the guide laws.

Guide Law
 A Guide's honour is to be trusted.
 A Guide is loyal.
 A Guides's duty is to be useful and help others.
 A Guide is friend to all and a sister to every other guide.
 A Guide is courteous.
 A Guide is a friend to animals and care for all living things.
 A Guide obey orders.
 A Guide smiles and sings under all difficulties.
 A Guide is thrifty.
 A Guide is pure in thought, word and in deed.

Gang Shows

The Penang Gang Show is organised by the Girl Guides of Penang.

See also
Persekutuan Pengakap Malaysia

Sources

External links
Persatuan Pandu Puteri Malaysia (PPPM)

World Association of Girl Guides and Girl Scouts member organizations
Scouting and Guiding in Malaysia
Youth organizations established in 1916
Women in Malaysia
Women's organisations based in Malaysia